A Lizard in a Woman's Skin is a 1971 giallo film directed by Lucio Fulci and produced by Edmondo Amati and Robert Dorfmann. It stars Florinda Bolkan, Stanley Baker, Jean Sorel, Leo Genn, and Anita Strindberg. The film was an Italian-Spanish-French co-production.

Set in London, the film follows Carol Hammond (Bolkan), the daughter of a respected politician, who experiences a series of vivid, psychedelic nightmares consisting of debauched sex orgies and LSD use. In the dream, she commits a graphic murder of a neighbor whose life she is envious of (Strindberg) and awakes to a real-life criminal investigation into the murder of her neighbour.

The film was released in France as Carole, and was later re-released in the US as Schizoid.  The French release print is the longest at 101 minutes.

Plot 
Carol Hammond (Florinda Bolkan) is the daughter of a wealthy lawyer and politician named Edmund Brighton (Leo Genn). Her husband Frank (Jean Sorel) is a lawyer working for Brighton's practice. They all live together in a large apartment with Joan (Ely Galleani), Frank's teenage daughter from a previous marriage. Carol has been visiting a psychoanalyst because of a string of disturbing dreams she's been having featuring her decadent neighbor, Julia Durer (Anita Strindberg). Julia's frequent, late-night parties infuriate and yet excite Carol, evoking images of wild sex-and-drug orgies.

During a meeting between Edmund and Frank, they talk about their recent court cases in which Edmund asks Frank if he has been unfaithful to Carol, which Frank denies. Then a phone call is made by an anonymous woman who claims to Edmund that she has damaging information about his family. But unknown to everyone, Frank is indeed having an affair with his personal secretary Deborah (Silvia Monti) whom he meets after work at her country house for some romantic tryst.

Carol's dreams continue which become more complicated during scenes that appear to be dreams or hallucinations. Describing her latest one to her psychoanalyst, they depict a lesbian encounter between the two women, culminating in Carol grisly stabbing the seductive Julia to death. In an enigmatic coda to the dream sequence, Carol sees two kaftan-clad hippies who have apparently witnessed the whole thing without intervening.

The following day, it's revealed that Julia Durer has indeed been murdered. Inspector Corvin (Stanley Baker) from Scotland Yard arrives to take charge of the investigation. The room and condition of the dead body are identical to their depiction in the dream sequence. To make matters even more incriminating, there is a discarded fur coat near the body. Learning of the murder, Carol insists that she see the scene of the crime and when she enters Julia's apartment and sees the body, she faints.

After weeding out a false and self-serving confession from a delirious regular at the Durer parties, Corvin focuses on Carol Hammond. Meanwhile, Carol, during a shopping excursion with her step-daughter Joan, see the two hippies from her dream sequence. Following them to an abandoned theater where other hippies hang out, Joan asks them if they know Carol or have ever seen her before. The hippy man and woman claim they had not. As the evidence against Carol mounts, the police surreptitiously obtain her fingerprints, which match those found on the murder weapon, and Carol is soon arrested and charged with murdering Julia. However, Corvin begins to wonder if she is the killer, as she had described the murder to her psychoanalyst in detail before it actually took place. Could it be that someone has read her dream diary that she kept and modeled the killing on dream images she described in order to frame her for something she fantasized about? Corvin also wonders who the two hippies are that she claims to have witnessed her crime without intervening.

As Carol is awaiting trial in the grounds of a maximum security sanitorium, she sees one of the hippies break in and chase her through the grounds. Carol flees into the building and in trying to hide she enters a room containing a hideous experiment: four live dogs, clamped in an upright position, whimper helplessly, their abdomens sliced open and pinned with surgical clamps exposing their glistening innards and still beating hearts. Carol faints in horror. When she comes around, there is no trace of the threatening man. The sanitorium director thinks that Carol's ramblings about the intruder, and the disemboweled dogs, must have been another one of her elaborate hallucinations.

Meanwhile, Carol's father swings into overdrive with her case and manages to elaborate a suspicion that appeals to the police. Edmund Brighton discovers Frank's affair with Deborah and that Julia Durer had been blackmailing him for money as not to expose his extramarital affair. Brighton's argument is enough to get Carol released on bail, but Frank remains free and desperately tries to prove his innocence.

While relaxing at Brighton's country estate, Carol is contacted by the hippy woman and agrees to meet with them at a secret rendezvous, at the Alexandra Palace in North London. Once there, Carol is attacked by the hippy man in the cellar and chased through the building where she gets attacked by bats in the attic and gets brutally stabbed as the hippy catches up to her on the rooftop. But Carol is rescued by the police, forcing the hippy man to flee. Another red herring emerges when Joan meets with the hippy woman concerning her stepmother's wellbeing and agreeing to meet. The next day, Joan is found murdered in a field with her throat cut. Inspector Corvin meets with Carol recovering at her father's estate to ask about the hippie couple and of the blackmail that Julia Durer may have been planning for Frank. Corvin finally tracks down and arrests the hippie couple, Hubert and Jenny, whom he takes to the scene of the crime to interrogate them about the Durer murder. Although Hubert admits to have stalked Carol and murdered Joan, they protest their innocence claiming not to remember anything about that night except for recalling "a lizard in a woman's skin". Then a phone call comes informing the police that Brighton has been found dead at his estate, the victim of a suicide, and leaving behind a note confessing to the murder of Julia Durer which seems to wrap up the case.

A few days later, Carol is at her father's grave when Corvin arrives to offer his condolences to her. When Corvin asks Carol about the phone call that her father got from Julia Durer which Carol admits that she knew about, he asks how did she know that Julia Durer phoned Mr. Brighton on the day before she was murdered since he never told anybody about it. Too late to realize her slip, Corvin deduces Carol's guilt as she was with Julia Durer during that day the phone call was made. As it turns out, Carol Hammond really did kill Julia Durer after she threatened to go public with their lesbian relationship which they've been having for several months. Carol did break into Julia's apartment and stabbed her to death, only to realize that two hippies saw her, which made her panic and leave the scene of the crime. Carol had felt certain that the two hippies would describe her to the police. The murderous, but sane, Carol entered the event in her dream diary immediately afterwards so by combining details of the murder with images from the recurring nightmares for which she had sought treatment, she hoped to avoid a murder sentence and get off with guilt by temporary insanity that the dream diary would provide plausible evidence in court of a split personality. But Carol did not realize that both hippies were high on LSD and unable to register the significance of what they saw that night. Carol is then led away by Inspector Corvin from her father's grave to a waiting police car.

Cast

Production

Filming locations
Filming locations included Woburn Abbey and Alexandra Palace, which was featured heavily in the film's climax.

Dog scene 
The film is perhaps most famous for a scene in which Mrs. Hammond opens the door to a room filled with dogs that are apparently being experimented on. The dogs are cut open with their hearts and guts still pulsating. The scene was so graphic and realistic that several crew members were forced to testify in court to disprove the accusation that real dogs were used in the film. Carlo Rambaldi, a special effects artist, saved Fulci from a two-year prison sentence by presenting the fake dog props in court to a seemingly unconvinced judiciary. This was the first time in film history that an effects artist had to prove his work was not real in a court of law.

Critical reception 
AllMovie wrote, "Lizard in Woman's Skin [sic] is a wild ride that offers plenty of bizarre moments that will stay stuck in the viewer's mind."

References

External links 

 
 

1971 films
1970s Italian-language films
1970s psychological thriller films
American International Pictures films
Films directed by Lucio Fulci
Films scored by Ennio Morricone
Films set in London
Films shot in Bedfordshire
Films shot in London
French psychological thriller films
Giallo films
Italian psychological thriller films
Spanish psychological thriller films
1970s Italian films
1970s French films
1970s Spanish films